Jamie D. Ramsay  (born 20 September) is a South African cinematographer. He was nominated for a British Independent Film Award for his work on the film Moffie (2019). He appeared on the 2021 Variety list of 10 Cinematographers to Watch.

Early life
Ramsay has dyslexia. He had an interest in the visual arts from a young age and took up photography when his grandfather gave him a camera, which developed into a passion for cinematography. He graduated from AFDA, The School for the Creative Economy in 2005.

Filmography

Awards and nominations

References

External links

Living people
People with dyslexia
South African cinematographers
Year of birth missing (living people)